In mathematics, there are several conjectures made by Emil Artin:
 Artin conjecture (L-functions)
 Artin's conjecture on primitive roots
 The (now proved) conjecture that finite fields are quasi-algebraically closed; see Chevalley–Warning theorem
 The (now disproved) conjecture that any algebraic form over the p-adics of degree d in more than d2 variables represents zero: that is, that all p-adic fields are C2; see Ax–Kochen theorem or Brauer's theorem on forms.
 Artin had also conjectured Hasse's theorem on elliptic curves